McCabe Creek is a river in Yukon Territory, Canada. A farm site on the creek was a checkpoint for the Yukon Quest sled dog race, but the checkpoint building burned down in 2009 and the site's future participation in the race is uncertain.

See also
List of rivers of Yukon

References 

Rivers of Yukon